This is a list of cricket grounds in the United States.  The only ICC-certified cricket stadium in North America is Central Broward Regional Park in Lauderhill, Florida. The Leo Magnus Cricket Complex in Los Angeles is an established cricket ground with four fields, while the Indianapolis World Sports Park opened in 2014, and hosted its first major competition the following year, the 2015 Americas Twenty20 Division One.

References

External links
Cricket grounds in USA at CricketArchive

Cricket grounds
Grounds
United States